The Reedy Glacier is a major glacier in Antarctica, over 160 km (100 mi) long and from 10 to 19 km (6 to 12 mi) wide, descending from the polar plateau to the Ross Ice Shelf between the Michigan Plateau and Wisconsin Range, and marking the limits of the Queen Maud Mountains on the west and the Horlick Mountains on the east.

Mapped by USGS from surveys and US Navy (USN) air photos, 1960–64.  Named by US-ACAN for Rear Admiral James R. Reedy, USN, Commander, U.S. Naval Support Force, Antarctica, from November 1962 until April 1965.

See also
 Transantarctic Mountains
 Langford Peak,  an isolated peak 2 nautical miles (4 km) west of the lower part of Reedy Glacier
 List of glaciers in the Antarctic

References

External links

Glaciers of Marie Byrd Land
Glaciers of the Ross Dependency
Transantarctic Mountains
Queen Maud Mountains
Gould Coast